Gisela Amail is a West German sprint canoer who competed in the mid-1950s. She won a bronze medal in the K-2 500 m event at the 1954 ICF Canoe Sprint World Championships in Mâcon.

References

West German female canoeists
Living people
Year of birth missing (living people)
ICF Canoe Sprint World Championships medalists in kayak